St. Paul African Methodist Episcopal Church is a 19th-century African American church located at 703 Merchant Street in Coatesville, Pennsylvania. The church was organized in 1864, relocated to its current location in 1874, and substantially renovated in 1894. The building was listed on the National Register of Historic Places on December 12, 2012.

See also 
 National Register of Historic Places listings in northern Chester County, Pennsylvania

References 

19th-century Methodist church buildings in the United States
African-American churches
African-American history of Pennsylvania
African Methodist Episcopal churches in Pennsylvania
Coatesville, Pennsylvania
Churches in Chester County, Pennsylvania
Churches on the National Register of Historic Places in Pennsylvania
Methodist churches in Pennsylvania
National Register of Historic Places in Chester County, Pennsylvania